Macleantown is a town in Buffalo City in the Eastern Cape province of South Africa.

Village 34 km north-west of East London and 46 km south-east of Stutterheim on the N6 road. Named in April 1881 after Colonel John Maclean (1810-1874), Chief Commissioner of British Caffraria from 1852 and Lieutenant-Governor of that territory from March 1860 to December 1864.

References

Populated places in Buffalo City Metropolitan Municipality